Kerri Louise Ferris (born 9 January 1970) is a former Australian rugby union player. She made her test debut for Australia in 1994 against the Black Ferns in Sydney. She competed at the 1998 and 2002 Rugby World Cup's.

Ferris was born in Gisborne, New Zealand. Her family moved to Australia when she was ten. She made 13 test appearances for the Wallaroos between 1994 and 2002. Her last test match was in the 2002 World Cup in Spain, it was against Scotland in Girona.

In 2022, Ferris was appointed as the Kariong Wanderers head coach, making her the first female rugby union head coach in the region.

References 

1970 births
Living people
Australian female rugby union players
Australia women's international rugby union players